Inductive logic programming (ILP) is a subfield of symbolic artificial intelligence  which uses logic programming as a uniform representation for examples, background knowledge and hypotheses. Given an encoding of the known background knowledge and a set of examples represented as a logical database of facts, an ILP system will derive a hypothesised logic program which entails all the positive and none of the negative examples.

 Schema: positive examples + negative examples + background knowledge ⇒ hypothesis.

Inductive logic programming is particularly useful in bioinformatics and natural language processing. Gordon Plotkin and Ehud Shapiro laid the initial theoretical foundation for inductive machine learning in a logical setting. Shapiro built their first implementation (Model Inference System) in 1981: a Prolog program that inductively inferred logic programs from positive and negative examples. The first full first-order implementation of inductive logic programming was Theorist in 1986. The term Inductive Logic Programming was first introduced in a paper by Stephen Muggleton in 1991. Muggleton also founded the annual international conference on Inductive Logic Programming, introduced the theoretical ideas of Predicate Invention, Inverse resolution, and Inverse entailment. Muggleton implemented Inverse entailment first in the PROGOL system. The term "inductive" here refers to philosophical (i.e. suggesting a theory to explain observed facts) rather than mathematical (i.e. proving a property for all members of a well-ordered set) induction.

Formal definition

The background knowledge is given as a logic theory , commonly in the form of Horn clauses used in logic programming.
A correct hypothesis  is a logic proposition satisfying the following requirements.

"Sufficiency" requires any generated hypothesis  to explain all positive examples .
"Weak consistency" forbids generation of any hypothesis  that contradicts the background knowledge .
"Strong consistency" also forbids generation of any hypothesis  that is inconsistent with the negative examples , given the background knowledge ; it implies "Weak consistency"; if no negative examples are given, both requirements coincide. Džeroski  requires only "Sufficiency" (called "Completeness" there) and "Strong consistency".

Example

The following well-known example about learning definitions of family relations uses the abbreviations 
It starts from the background knowledge (cf. picture)
,
the positive examples
,
and the trivial proposition

to denote the absence of negative examples.

Plotkin's  "relative least general generalization (rlgg)" approach to inductive logic programming shall be used to obtain a suggestion about how to formally define the daughter relation .

This approach uses the following steps.
 Relativize each positive example literal with the complete background knowledge:
,
 Convert into clause normal form:
,
 Anti-unify each compatible  pair  of literals:
 Delete all negated literals containing variables that don't occur in a positive literal:
 Convert clauses back to Horn form:
 
The resulting Horn clause is the hypothesis  obtained by the rlgg approach.

Concerning the above requirements, "Necessity" was satisfied because the predicate  doesn't appear in the background knowledge, which hence cannot imply any property containing this predicate, such as the positive examples are.

The common definition of the grandmother relation, viz. , cannot be learned using the above approach, since the variable  occurs in the clause body only; the corresponding literals would have been deleted in the 4th step of the approach. To overcome this flaw, that step has to be modified such that it can be parametrized with different literal post-selection heuristics. Historically, the GOLEM implementation is based on the rlgg approach.

Inductive Logic Programming system 
Inductive Logic Programming system is a program that takes as an input logic theories  and outputs a correct hypothesis  wrt theories  An algorithm of an ILP system consists of two parts: hypothesis search and hypothesis selection. First a hypothesis is searched with an inductive logic programming procedure, then a subset of the found hypotheses (in most systems one hypothesis) is chosen by a selection algorithm. A selection algorithm scores each of the found hypotheses and returns the ones with the highest score. An example of score function include minimal compression length where a hypothesis with a lowest Kolmogorov complexity has the highest score and is returned. An ILP system is complete iff for any input logic theories  any correct hypothesis  wrt to these input theories can be found with its hypothesis search procedure.

Hypothesis search 
However, the operation of the anti-entailment since being highly non-deterministic is computationally more expensive. Therefore, an alternative hypothesis search can be conducted using the operation of the inverse subsumption (anti-subsumption) instead which is less non-deterministic than anti-entailment.

Questions of completeness of a hypothesis search procedure of specific ILP system arise. For example, Progol's hypothesis search procedure based on the inverse entailment inference rule is not complete by Yamamoto's example. On the other hand, Imparo is complete by both anti-entailment procedure  and its extended inverse subsumption  procedure.

Implementations 
 1BC and 1BC2: first-order naive Bayesian classifiers:
 ACE (A Combined Engine)
 Aleph
 Atom 
 Claudien
 DL-Learner
 DMax
 FastLAS (Fast Learning from Answer Sets)
 FOIL (First Order Inductive Learner)
 Golem
 ILASP (Inductive Learning of Answer Set Programs)
 Imparo
 Inthelex (INcremental THEory Learner from EXamples) 
 Lime
 Metagol
 Mio
 MIS (Model Inference System) by Ehud Shapiro
 PROGOL
 RSD
 Warmr (now included in ACE)
 ProGolem

See also
 Commonsense reasoning
 Formal concept analysis
 Inductive reasoning
 Inductive programming
 Inductive probability
 Statistical relational learning
 Version space learning

References

Further reading

 
 
 Visual example of inducing the grandparenthood relation by the Atom system. http://john-ahlgren.blogspot.com/2014/03/inductive-reasoning-visualized.html